Rostam Sioud (born 11 July 1988) is a French footballer who currently plays as a goalkeeper for Rejiche.

Career statistics

Club

Notes

References

1988 births
Living people
French footballers
Association football goalkeepers
US Saint-Malo players
AS Vitré players
El Makarem de Mahdia players